Letizia Maria Moratti (née Brichetto Arnaboldi; Milan, 26 November 1949) is an Italian businesswoman and politician. She was president of RAI (1994–1996), minister of Education, University and Research (2001–2006), mayor of Milan (2006–2011) and president of the board of directors of UBI Banca (2019–2020). In January 2021 she was appointed vice president and assessor of Welfare of Lombardy.

Biography
Moratti was born in Milan. She graduated in political science from the University of Milan. She was married to the oil magnate Gianmarco Moratti (brother of Massimo Moratti) and has two children, Gabriele and Gilda. She is the granddaughter of Mimina Brichetto Arnaboldi,

Moratti is a businesswoman who has worked in insurance and telecommunications. Between 1994 and 1996 she was chairperson of the Italian state television company RAI. At the end of 1998, and for about a year, she became chairman of News Corp Europe, a company headed by Rupert Murdoch and owner of Stream TV.

From 2001 to 2006, she was Minister of Education, University and Research in the second and third Berlusconi cabinets. During her mandate, she put forward a reform of the education system that was named after her as Riforma Moratti.

She ran for Mayor of Milan in the 2006 municipal election as the House of Freedoms candidate and won with over 52% of the votes. She sought a second term in 2011, but lost to the centre-left candidate Giuliano Pisapia.

Mayor of Milan (2006–2011)

Expo 2015
Under Moratti, Milan was selected in 2007 as hosting city for the Expo 2015. Its rival İzmir, Turkey, lost for 61 votes against 86 in the Bureau des Expositions gather in the Palais des congrès of Paris. Moratti was Commissioner of the Expo until 2011, when after her electoral lost, resigned herself as Commissioner, out of respect for the new administration.

Parks
The Moratti Administration also continued the Gabriele Albertini's parkings program, and in 2006 created 64,000 underground parking spaces, also in neighborhoods like Naviglio Grande and Sant'Ambrogio's zone.
In 2007 Moratti launched the "Cycle Mobiliting Plan", which foresaw 53 km of cycling infrastructures, 2,385 new racks in 1,174 different localities, with 5,000 bikes and 250 stations in all cities within 2011.
In 2008 Moratti created the Ecopass, a road pricing, in the Milan Center. This decision received several critics also in his majority.
In 2010 she also launched the use of public electric car in various zones of her city.

Moratti proposed unsuccessfully a park dedicated to Bettino Craxi, the controversial Socialist leader who died while exiled in Tunisia in 2000.

Assessor of Welfare and Vice President of Lombardy (January 2021 – November 2022) 
In January 2021, she was appointed Vice President and Assessor of Welfare in the Regional Cabinet of Lombardy. She resigned on 2 November 2022 to be a candidate for president of Lombardy.

Controversies
In 2006, Moratti was accused of firing 10 dirigents of the city. For this spoils system, Moratti was convicted for office abuse. The sentence was archived because her acts were not illegal. She served in the city council only 6 presences in 2008 and 3 in 2009. In 2007, Moratti intervened to prevent the opening of Art and Homosexuality – From von Gloeden to Pierre et Gilles at the Palazzo della Ragione in Milan. Curated by Eugenio Viola and promoted by Vittorio Sgarbi, Moratti backed objections to the exhibition from Catholic politicians and insisted that it would only proceed if a blacklist of works were removed on the ground that they could be offensive to Catholics and unsuitable for children.

Moratti appointed Lucio Stanca, a member of the Chamber of Deputies, as managing director for the Expo 2015, despite the vote of the city council against her decision. In 2010, a civil court complained against Moratti Administration, the Minister Roberto Maroni and the prefect of Milan Gan Valerio Lombardi for the lack of appointment of popular houses to 10 Romani families, called it as "racist gesture". The accused justified themselves saying the Roma were a nomadic people.

References

1949 births
Living people
Mayors of Milan
Women mayors of places in Italy
Education ministers of Italy
Women government ministers of Italy
21st-century Italian women politicians
21st-century Italian politicians